Uzun İnce Bir Yoldayım, translated to English: "I Walk On A Long And Narrow Road" is one of Aşık Veysel's best known works and is still popular among fans of Turkish folk music.

See also
Aşık Veysel

References

Turkish music
Turkish songs
Year of song missing